Palermo Township may refer to:
 Palermo Township, Grundy County, Iowa
 Palermo Township, Mountrail County, North Dakota, in Mountrail County, North Dakota

Township name disambiguation pages